The Chainman Formation is a geologic formation in Nevada. It preserves fossils dating back to the Carboniferous period.

See also

 List of fossiliferous stratigraphic units in Nevada
 Paleontology in Nevada

References 
 
 Oilshalegas.com; Chainman Shale - Nevada Oil & Gas 
 Oil & Gas Journal: "Nevada's Chainman shale shows exploration potential", 06/02/2014

Oil shale geology
Oil shale in the United States
Shale formations of the United States
Geologic formations of Nevada
Geologic formations of Utah
Carboniferous geology of Nevada
Carboniferous geology of Utah
Mississippian United States
Geography of Lincoln County, Nevada
Geography of Nye County, Nevada
Geography of White Pine County, Nevada
Carboniferous System of North America
Carboniferous southern paleotropical deposits